Diane Johnson (born 28 June 1960), better known by her stage name Diane Louise Jordan, is a British television presenter. She was the first black presenter of the children's television programme Blue Peter, being involved in the programme from 25 January 1990 until 26 February 1996.  While on Blue Peter, her co-presenters were Yvette Fielding, John Leslie, Anthea Turner, Tim Vincent, Stuart Miles and Katy Hill.

Life and career
Born in 1960, Jordan grew up in Hatfield, Hertfordshire. Her parents came over to England from Jamaica in the 1950s and were part of the Windrush generation. She studied theatre arts at Rose Bruford College, and worked as a stage actress after graduating. She appeared on children's series Corners, when she was spotted by Blue Peter editor Lewis Bronze. She became the programme's first black presenter and turned down a role in soap opera Coronation Street for the job. In 1988 she played the chemist shop assistant in the Mike Leigh film High Hopes.  She later played the part of Kate Winterton in Coronation Street in September 1989.

Jordan can currently be seen presenting BBC One's religious programme, Songs of Praise. She also is vice-president of Action for Children, sits on the Council of the Prince's Trust, is a Patron of the ADHD Foundation and is a trustee for BBC Children in Need. In 1997 she sat on the Diana, Princess of Wales, Memorial Committee. She is a celebrity supporter of the Bone Cancer Research Trust (BCRT)

She married violinist Giles Broadbent in 2007. She has a daughter, Justine, previously her niece, but whom she adopted when her sister died unexpectedly. Between February 2012 and July 2017 Jordan presented Sunday Half Hour and then  Sunday Hour  on BBC Radio 2.

References

External links
www.dianelouisejordan.com

Interview with Diane in Xt3 Christian Magazine

1960 births
Living people
BBC Radio 2 presenters
Black British television personalities
Black British radio presenters
Blue Peter presenters
English television presenters
Alumni of Rose Bruford College
English Christians
People from Hackney Central
People from Hatfield, Hertfordshire
English people of Jamaican descent